George Henry Cowan (June 17, 1858 – September 20, 1935) was a Canadian lawyer and Conservative politician. He represented Vancouver City in the House of Commons of Canada for one term from 1908 to 1911.

Born in Watford, Canada West, Cowan was educated at the University of Toronto and Osgoode Hall. He was called to the Ontario Bar in 1889 and moved to British Columbia in 1893. He was called to the British Columbia Bar in 1893 and practiced law in Vancouver. From 1907 to 1910, he was the city solicitor for Vancouver.

In 1894, he helped organize the first Conservative Association of Vancouver and served as its first secretary. He was elected to the Canadian House of Commons for Vancouver City in the 1908 election. He did not run for re-election.

He was the author of The Chinese Question in Canada and Better Terms for British Columbia.

He died at his home in Vancouver on September 20, 1935.

References

External links
 

1858 births
1935 deaths
Lawyers in British Columbia
Conservative Party of Canada (1867–1942) MPs
Members of the House of Commons of Canada from British Columbia